Beshekee, also Pezeke and other variant spellings of Ojibwe Bizhiki (English: Buffalo), was a noted war chief from the Bear doodem of the Pillager Chippewa Band during the 19th century in North America.

As a young man, he signed the 1837 Treaty of St. Peters as Pe-zhe-kins (Bizhikiins, meaning "Young Buffalo"), a Warrior.  The Pillager Band was famous for producing skilled fighters in the wars against the Dakota, and in his time, Beshekee was among the most respected of these.

In 1855, he travelled with Aysh-ke-bah-ke-ko-zhay (Flat Mouth), another prominent Pillager leader, to Washington, D.C. to address the grievances of the Mississippi Chippewa and to negotiate a cession of Ojibwe lands at the headwaters of the Mississippi River to the U.S. Government.

Beshekee would later sign the 1863 Treaty that partially addressed these grievances by establishing permanent reservations in Minnesota, including one at Leech Lake.

External links
 The 1847 Treaty between the United States and the Pillager Band of Chippewa Indians

Ojibwe people
Native American leaders
Native American history of Minnesota
People of pre-statehood Minnesota
Year of birth unknown
Year of death missing